Ira Hansen (born October 5, 1960) is an American politician and member of the Republican Party who has been a member of the Nevada State Senate for the 14th district since 2018. He formerly represented the Nevada Assembly's 32nd district from 2010 to 2018.

Biography
Hansen was born in Reno, Nevada and attended local Washoe County schools. While attending Sparks High School Ira met his future wife, Alexis Lloyd. As of 2014 they have been married for 34 years and have 8 children. Hansen started his own plumbing company in 1986 at the age of 26. He is a member of the Church of Jesus Christ of Latter-day Saints and has been involved in the community as a Sparks Little League coach, a Sparks Pop Warner coach and as a Scoutmaster for the Boy Scouts of America. He is a third generation Eagle Scout and all of his four sons are Eagle Scouts.

Hansen was an opinion columnist for the Sparks Tribune and was previously a talk radio host on station KKOH in Reno for five years and later for 99.1 KKFT.

Hansen is a lifetime member of Nevada Bighorns Unlimited, the NRA and other sportsmen and gun rights groups. His website states that he believes in "constitutionally limited government, lower taxes, and individual responsibility". He has been a proponent of states rights and has opposed what he believes is overreach by the Bureau of Land Management and other federal agencies. Hansen has been an advocate for the construction industry by calling for a reform to Nevada's construction defect laws which he believes hurt the Nevada construction industry and are only benefiting attorneys who "have boasted that they have grossed over a billion dollars in construction defect claims." Hansen is an advocate for the mining industry and says on his website that "mining is the bedrock of Nevada's rural economy even today". He is a member of the Nevada Renewable Energy Coalition and believes in using renewable energy sources to create jobs.

Hansen was elected to the Nevada Assembly in 2010 and re-elected in 2012 and 2014.

Legislative Record 
Hansen currently serves as the Chairman of the Nevada Assembly's Judiciary Committee.  In the 5 years he's held office Hansen has built an impressive legislative record.  In 2011 Hansen codified his reputation as a 2nd Amendment leader by authoring AB217 which repealed restrictions on some firearm sales.  AB217 passed unanimously and was signed by Governor Brian Sandoval.  In 2015 Hansen sponsor legislation that allowed firearms to be carried and stored in family foster homes, in certain circumstances (AB167.)

Hansen has also been a staunch advocate for the federal government transferring control of land in Nevada back to the state.  In 2013 Hansen passed AB227 which created the Nevada Land Management Task Force, with the goal of studying the transfer of federal land back to Nevada. In 2015 following the findings of the study Hansen sponsored and passed SRJ1 and SRJ2 which first urged the United States Congress to transfer the title of some public lands to the state of Nevada and second required the federal government to share receipts from commercial activity on the land which the state and the counties in which the activities were performed.

Ratings and Endorsements 
Hansen has been endorsed by the National Federation of Independent Business in 2016 and 2015.

Hansen received a 100% rating from the National Rifle Association after they endorsed him in 2012 and gave him an "A" rating in 2011.

Awards 
In March 2016 the Associated General Contractors honored Hansen as an outstanding community member.

Assembly speaker designate
On November 7, 2014, Nevada Assembly Republicans named Hansen as their candidate for the chamber's next Speaker.

Following the announcement, the News Review'''s Dennis Myers conducted an extensive search of an estimated 800 columns Hansen wrote for the Sparks Tribune'' from 1994 through 2010, almost all of which were only available on microfilm. Myers had previously written articles exposing the racist and anti-Semitic legislator Pat McCarran, whom Hansen had defended.

In his columns, Hansen has written that the Oklahoma City bombing was a false flag operation orchestrated by the administration of President Clinton, that women do not belong in the United States Armed Forces, that President Obama is a "negro", that he owns and flies a Confederate battle flag, that gays are disproportionally prone to engaging in child abuse, that a "grossly disproportionate" number of crimes are committed by Latinos, and that the relationship between "Negroes and Democrats" is that of a "master-slave relationship with the benevolent master knowing what’s best for his simple minded darkies."

Hansen's comments drew national attention. Hansen apologized on November 20, saying that it was "unfortunate" that his comments had been "taken out of context" and "portrayed as intentionally hurtful and disrespectful", saying that "these comments made nearly 20 years ago" as an opinion columnist were "meant to be purposely provocative in various political, cultural and religious views."

Hansen wrote an open letter on the press page of his website, saying "I freely admit my choice of words was at times very poor. As a columnist, I was encouraged to write provocatively but over the last 20 years I have learned that there is a line between being provocative and being offensive. There were times when I crossed that line. My intention was not to offend, and for any offense I have caused I again sincerely apologize." He also responded to specific things he had said. He further claimed that "this has been a carefully orchestrated attack to remove a conservative Republican from a major leadership role in State government. The deliberate character assassination and the politics of personal destruction have totally distorted my views and record."

References

External links
Deseret News Feb. 2, 2012 article on Hansen's opposition to Mitt Romney in Nevada
Hansen campaign bio
Legislative bio of Hansen

1960 births
Latter Day Saints from Nevada
Living people
Republican Party members of the Nevada Assembly
Republican Party Nevada state senators
Politicians from Reno, Nevada
Radio personalities from Nevada
American plumbers
21st-century American politicians